Cerautola legeri, the St. Leger's epitola, is a butterfly in the family Lycaenidae. It is found in eastern Nigeria. Its habitat consists of forests.

References

Endemic fauna of Nigeria
Butterflies described in 1999
Poritiinae
Butterflies of Africa